Anak Wungsu was the youngest brother of Airlangga, who succeeded him as the ruler of Bali and Java.

See also 
 Pujungan Inscription

References
Pringle,Robert. (2004) A Short History of Bali: Indonesia's Hindu Realm. Crows Nest, NSW: Allan & Unwin .

Indonesian Hindu monarchs
11th-century Indonesian people